Sulo Heino (14 December 1908 – 24 April 1996) was a Finnish athlete. He competed in the men's hammer throw at the 1936 Summer Olympics.

References

External links
 

1908 births
1996 deaths
Athletes (track and field) at the 1936 Summer Olympics
Finnish male hammer throwers
Olympic athletes of Finland
People from Tuusula
Sportspeople from Uusimaa